Maakan Tounkara (born 1983 in Epernay,  France) is a French handball player. She plays for the French national team. She participated at the 2008 Summer Olympics in China, where the French team placed fifth.

References

People from Épernay
1983 births
Living people
French female handball players
Handball players at the 2008 Summer Olympics
Olympic handball players of France
French sportspeople of Malian descent
French sportspeople of Guinean descent
Sportspeople from Marne (department)
Black French sportspeople